The Bezeklik Thousand Buddha Caves (Uyghur: بزقلیق مىڭ ئۆيى ) is a complex of Buddhist cave grottos dating from the 5th to 14th century between the cities of Turpan and Shanshan (Loulan) at the north-east of the Taklamakan Desert near the ancient ruins of Gaochang in the Mutou Valley, a gorge in the Flaming Mountains, in the Xinjiang region of western China. They are high on the cliffs of the west Mutou Valley under the Flaming Mountains, and most of the surviving caves date from the West Uyghur kingdom around the 10th to 13th centuries.

Bezeklik murals

There are 77 rock-cut caves at the site. Most have rectangular spaces with rounded arch ceilings often divided into four sections, each with a mural of the Buddha. The effect is of entire ceiling covers with hundreds of Buddha murals. Some murals show a large Buddha surrounded by other figures, including Turks, Indians and Europeans. The quality of the murals vary with some being artistically naive while others are masterpieces of religious art. The murals that best represent the Bezeklik Thousand Buddha Caves are the large-sized murals, which were given the name the "Praṇidhi Scene", paintings depicting Sakyamuni’s "promise" or "praṇidhi" from his past life.

Professor James A. Millward described the original Uyghurs as physically Mongoloid, giving as an example the images in Bezeklik at temple 9 of the Uyghur patrons, until they began to mix with the Tarim Basin's original Indo-European Tocharian inhabitants. However, according to a genetic study of early Uyghur remains from the Uyghur Khaganate in Mongolia, the Uyghurs were actually predominantly West Eurasian,  being modelled as genetically similar to the Iranian Alan and Sarmatian people, with significant East Eurasian admixture. The east–west admixture in the Uyghur Khaganate was said to have taken place around the year 500 AD. Buddhist Uyghurs created the Bezeklik murals. However, Peter B. Golden writes that the Uyghurs not only adopted the writing system and religious faiths of the Indo-European Sogdians, such as Manichaeism, Buddhism, and Christianity, but also looked to the Sogdians as "mentors" while gradually replacing them in their roles as Silk Road traders and purveyors of culture. Indeed, Sogdians wearing silk robes are seen in the praṇidhi scenes of Bezeklik murals, particularly Scene 6 from Temple 9 showing Sogdian donors to the Buddha. The paintings of Bezeklik, while having a small amount of Indian influence, is primarily influenced by Chinese and Iranian styles, particularly Sasanian Persian landscape painting. Albert von Le Coq was the first to study the murals and published his findings in 1913. He noted how in Scene 14 from Temple 9 one of the West Eurasian-looking figures with green eyes, wearing a green fur-trimmed coat and presenting a bowl with what he assumed were bags of gold dust, wore a hat that he found reminiscent of the headgear of Sasanian Persian princes.

The Buddhist Uyghurs of the Kingdom of Qocho and Turfan were converted to Islam by conquest during a ghazat (holy war) at the hands of the Muslim Chagatai Khanate ruler Khizr Khoja (r. 1389-1399). After being converted to Islam, the descendants of the previously Buddhist Uyghurs in Turfan failed to retain memory of their ancestral legacy and falsely believed that the "infidel Kalmuks" (Dzungars) were the ones who built Buddhist monuments in their area.

The murals at Bezeklik have suffered considerable damage. Many of the temples were damaged by local Muslim population whose religion proscribed figurative images of sentient beings; all statues were destroyed, some paintings defaced and others smeared with mud, the eyes and mouths were often gouged out due to the local belief that the figures may otherwise come to life at night. Michael Dillon considered Bezeklik's Thousand Buddha Caves are an example of the religiously motivated iconoclasm against depiction of religious and human figures. Pieces of murals were also broken off for use as fertilizer by the locals. During the late nineteen and early twentieth century, European and Japanese explorers found intact murals buried in sand, and many were removed and dispersed around the world.  Some of the best preserved murals were removed by German explorer Albert von Le Coq and sent to Germany. Large pieces such as those showing Praṇidhi scene were permanently fixed to walls in the Museum of Ethnology in Berlin. During the Second World War they could not be removed for safekeeping, and were thus destroyed when the museum was caught in the bombing of Berlin by the Allies. Other pieces may now be found in various museums around the world, such as the Hermitage Museum in St. Petersburg, Tokyo National Museum in Japan, the British Museum in London, and the national museums of Korea and India.

A digital recreation of the Bezeklik murals removed by explorers was shown in Japan.

Gallery

See also
Ah-ai Grotto
Mogao Caves
Kizil Caves
Tianlongshan Grottoes
 Silk Road transmission of Buddhism
 German Turfan expeditions

Footnotes

Further reading
Chotscho : vol.1
Altbuddhistische Kultstätten in Chinesisch-Turkistan : vol.1
Kitsudo, Koichi (2013). "Historical Significance of Bezeklik cave 20 in the Uyghur Buddhism" in Buddhism and Art in Turfan: From the Perspective of Uyghur Buddhism: Buddhist Culture along the Silk Road: Gandhåra, Kucha, and Turfan, Section II. Kyoto: 141-168 (texts in English and Japanese).
Polichetti, Massimiliano A.. 1999. “A Short Consideration Regarding Christian Elements in a Ninth Century Buddhist Wall-fainting from Bezeklik”. The Tibet Journal 24 (2). Library of Tibetan Works and Archives: 101–7. https://www.jstor.org/stable/43302426.

External links

Chotscho: Facsimile Reproduction of Important Findings of the First Royal Prussian Expedition to Turfan in East Turkistan, Berlin, 1913.  A catalogue of the findings of the Second German Turfan Expedition (1904–1905) led by Le Coq, containing colour reproductions of the murals.  (National Institute of Informatics – Digital Silk Road Project Digital Archive of Toyo Bunko Rare Books)
Reconstruction of Bezeklik murals at Ryukoku Museum
[ Bezeklik mural at Hermitage Museum]
Silk Route photos
Mogao Caves
Silk Road site

Major National Historical and Cultural Sites in Xinjiang
Chinese Buddhist grottoes
Sites along the Silk Road
Religion in Xinjiang
Caves of Xinjiang
Chinese architectural history
Buddhist temples in Turpan